Kenneth Yeboah (born October 30, 1998) is an American football tight end for the New York Jets of the National Football League (NFL). He played college football at Temple and Ole Miss.

Early years
Yeboah was born in Providence, Rhode Island. Following his sophomore year in high school, his family moved to Allentown, Pennsylvania. He attended Parkland High School in South Whitehall Township, Pennsylvania, where he was a starter on the basketball and football teams. Yeboah had 47 receptions for 773 yards and 13 touchdowns in his junior season. As a senior, he caught 72 passes for 1,160 yards and 14 touchdowns and had five interceptions on defense and was named Class AAAA All-State. 

Yeboah committed to play college football at Temple over offers from Towson, Old Dominion, and New Hampshire.

College career
As a freshman, Yeboah played in one game and caught a 15-yard pass before redshirting the season in order to transition from wide receiver to tight end. He had 14 receptions for 136 yards in his redshirt freshman season. Yeboah finished his redshirt sophomore season with 13 catches for 154 yards and one touchdown. After the season, Yeboah entered the transfer portal to play at another program for his final season of eligibility. 

Yeboah originally committed to transfer to Baylor in order to play for Matt Rhule, who had previously coached him at Temple, but de-committed after Rhule left the school to become the head coach of the Carolina Panthers. He ultimately transferred to Ole Miss for his final season. Yeboah set a school record for most receiving yards in a game by a tight end with 181 on seven receptions and two touchdowns on October 10, 2020 in a 63-48 loss to Alabama. He finished the season with 27 receptions for 524 yards and six touchdowns.

On December 17, 2020, Yeboah announced that he was forgoing the remainder of the 2020 season and entering the 2021 NFL Draft.

Professional career

Yeboah signed with the New York Jets as an undrafted free agent on May 7, 2021. He was waived on August 31, 2021 and re-signed to the practice squad the next day. Yeboah was elevated to the active roster on October 9, 2021, for the team's week 5 game against the Atlanta Falcons and made his NFL debut in the game. On November 16, 2021, Yeboah was signed to the active roster. In a January 2, 2022 game against the Tampa Bay Buccaneers, Yeboah collected his first two NFL receptions (for a total of 36 yards), both from quarterback Zach Wilson.

On August 30, 2022, Yeboah was waived by the Jets and signed to the practice squad the next day. He was promoted to the active roster on November 5.

References

External links
Temple Owls bio
Ole Miss Rebels bio

1998 births
Living people
American football tight ends
Parkland High School (Pennsylvania) alumni
New York Jets players
Ole Miss Rebels football players
Players of American football from Providence, Rhode Island
Players of American football from Pennsylvania
Sportspeople from Allentown, Pennsylvania
Temple Owls football players